Cinommata is a genus of moths in the family Saturniidae first described by Arthur Gardiner Butler in 1882.

Species
Cinommata bistrigata Butler, 1882

References

Hemileucinae